Zion Gate (Sha'ar Zion, Bab Sahyun), also known in Arabic as Bab Harat al-Yahud ("Jewish Quarter Gate") or Bab an-Nabi Dawud ("Prophet David Gate"), is one of the seven historic Gates of the Old City of Jerusalem.

History
Zion Gate was built in July 1540, west of the location of the medieval gate, which was a direct continuation of the Street of the Jews (also known as the Cardo). Six sentry towers were erected in the southern segment of the wall, four of them situated in the Mount Zion section.

In the second half of the nineteenth century, a leper colony, slaughter house and livestock market were situated in the vicinity of Zion Gate. Towards the end of the nineteenth century, shops were built along the length of the southern wall which were torn down during the British Mandate.

On May 13, 1948, as the British Army withdrew from Jerusalem, a major from the Suffolk Regiment presented Mordechai Weingarten with the key for the Zion Gate.

In 2008, restoration work was carried out on the gate, marking its 468th birthday.

See also

 Gates of the Old City of Jerusalem
 Walls of Jerusalem
Battle for Jerusalem
Suleiman the Magnificent

References

External links
Photos of the Zion Gate at the Manar al-Athar photo archive

Infrastructure completed in 1540
Zion
Jewish Quarter (Jerusalem)